Steel Connect, Inc. is an American company that provides supply chain management services to software companies. During the dot-com bubble, the company, which was then known as CMGI, Inc., had a market capitalization of $41 billion and owned the naming rights to the new home stadium of the New England Patriots. Between 1995 and 1999, it had the best-performing stock in the United States, returning 4,921%. After the crash of the bubble, the stock price fell 99%.

The company was formerly known as College Marketing Group, CMG Information Systems, and ModusLink Global Solutions, Inc.

History
The company was formed in 1968 as College Marketing Group by Glenn and Gail Mathews. At first, the company sold mailing lists of university faculty to textbook publishers.

In 1986, after a leveraged buyout, David Wetherell became CEO.

In February 1994, the company became a public company via an initial public offering. That same month, Wetherell founded BookLink, in which the company invested $900,000. BookLink was sold to America Online in November 1994 and the company used the proceeds of the sale to set up CMG @Ventures, a venture capital firm that invested in internet companies.

The company invested $1 million for an 80% ownership interest in Lycos, which was its most profitable investment.

In 1997, the company invested in Geocities and it also formed Navisite.

In June 1999, the company agreed to acquire an 83% stake in AltaVista from Compaq for $2.3 billion.

In September 1999, the company acquired AdForce, founded by Chad Steelberg, for $500 million.

In November 1999, Altavista acquired RagingBull.com after Wetherell noticed the website while on vacation.

In March 2000, the company acquired Yesmail.

In April 2000, the company acquired uBid.

In May 2000, the company acquired Tallan, Inc. for $920M.

In August 2000, the company agreed to pay $7.6 million per year for 15 years for the naming rights of the home stadium of the New England Patriots. In August 2002, after the bursting of the dot-com bubble, the company modified the agreement and the stadium name was changed to Gillette Stadium.

In 2000, the company recorded a $661 million gain when Yahoo! acquired its interest in GeoCities. By that time, its stock price had declined 78% from its high earlier in the year.

In February 2004, the company acquired Modus Media.

In September 2008, the company changed its name to ModusLink Global Solutions, Inc.

In December 2017, the company acquired IWCO Direct for $476 million in cash.

In February 2018, the company changed its name to Steel Connect, Inc.

On Nov. 19, 2020, Steel Partners Holdings LP delivered a non-binding proposal to Steel Connect’s board of directors to acquire all the outstanding shares of common stock not already owned by Steel Partners and its affiliates. As of March 10, 2021, Steel Connect reported that it has not made a decision on the proposal.

References

1968 establishments in Massachusetts
Dot-com bubble
Online companies of the United States
Software companies based in Massachusetts
Waltham, Massachusetts
Companies listed on the Nasdaq
Software companies of the United States